Elena Ivanovna Andreïanova , sometimes spelt Yelena Andreyanova (Russian Елена Ивановна Андреянова), 13 July 1819  St. Petersburg - 28 October 1857  Paris, was a Russian ballerina. She  is considered to be the outstanding Russian ballerina of the romantic genre, but her life was one full of tragedy.

Biography 
Little is known about her childhood. At ten-years of age she entered  the  St. Petersburg Drama school. Among her teachers were Philippe Taglioni and his daughter Marie Taglioni. She graduated in 1837, and joined the Mariinsky ballet troop where she was  the first Russian dancer to interpret the title roles in Giselle (1842), La Peri (1844 ) and Paquita (1847).

She  became the mistress of the Director of the Imperial Theater, Alexander Guedeonov. Antagonism developed between Guedenov and Andreianova when guest French ballerinas Marie Taglioni and Fanny Elssler,  were given  some of her parts  and got  acclaim from audiences instead of her.  To placate his mistress, Guedenov sent her to star in the Moscow Bolshoi Ballet. But here a new set of rivalries took hold. Fans of the Bolshoi ballerinas were upset that their favourite  dancers were displaced by the St Petersburg  dancers  especially their prima ballerina Catherine Sankovski. They booed Andreïanova and during one performance, instead of throwing flowers they threw a dead cat on the stage. The shocked  Andreianova fainted. The audience relented and gave a standing ovation. She stayed on for 15 years at the Bolshoi.

She toured Europe in 1846 with a troop from the Bolshoi, appearing in  Paris, Hamburg, Brussels and Milan. She struck audiences with her combination of grace and fire. A dispute arose with management of the Paris Opera, who  not only did not pay her for her performances, but instead  demanded a fee for giving the troop the opportunity to show their art. However this rebounded on the Paris Opera when Andreianova persuaded the leading Paris male ballet dancer Marius Petipa to abandon Paris and join her troop. In Italy she danced at  "La Scala" and was rapturously received, medals were  cast in her honour, something only given previously to the greatest performers like  Marie Taglioni and Fanny Elssler.

The French choreographer Jules Perrot wrote  two roles especially for her in his ballets: as the Black Fairy in  Adana (1850), and the Countess Bertha in Wayward Wife (1851).

In 1852 Andreyanova visited London, but this tour turned out to be unsuccessful. Returning home, her relationship with Guedeonov ended when he took a new lover, and she was fired from  the Imperial Theatres in 1854.

She decided to  organise a tour of her own of the Russian provinces, taking with her artists from the Bolshoi Theatre and pupils from the  Moscow Ballet School in a troop, led and managed by herself. The tour visited  Kharkiv, Poltava, Kiev, Voronezh, Tambov and Odessa. Andreyanova had the idea of a large two-act ballet  for the tour called "The Fountain of Bakhchisarai" based on the poem of that name by Alexander Pushkin. Its premiere took place in Voronezh in 1854.  The tour was unexpectedly interrupted that same year in Odessa when the Crimean War threatened the city with bombardment. The troupe was disbanded and  the tour was not a financial success which put a great strain on Andreyanova.

The grueling demands of the tour undermined the health of many of  the dancers but especially Andreyanova who bore the financial worries. She returned to St. Petersburg in ill health, and after some time, though still seriously ill,  went to Paris for treatment.

She never recovered her health and  died in  Paris  in 1857 from nervous exhaustion at the young age of 38 years  . She  is  buried at the Pere Lachaise cemetery in the 20th arrondissement. Her grave stone was chosen by herself shortly before her death and represents Giselle leaning against a cross.

The Venusian crater Andreianova is named in her honor.

References

 Elena Andreianova - Entry in the Great Soviet Encyclopedia,  3rd Edition (1970-1979), republished in English by The Free Dictionary. Accessed February 2016
 Helena Andreyanova Famous Women, May 2008. Accessed Feb 2016
 Andreyanova, Helena // Russian Biographical Dictionary  : in 25 volumes. - SPb. - M ., 1896-1918.
 Skalkovsky K, Dance, ballet, their history and place in a number of Fine Arts,1886,  chapter VIII, p. 206-221 

19th-century ballet dancers from the Russian Empire
Prima ballerinas
Ballerinas from the Russian Empire
1819 births
1857 deaths